Ralph F Hodges is a former Rhodesian international lawn bowler.

He won a gold medal in the singles at the 1954 British Empire and Commonwealth Games in Vancouver.

References

Possibly living people
Zimbabwean male bowls players
Bowls players at the 1954 British Empire and Commonwealth Games
Commonwealth Games gold medallists for Southern Rhodesia
Commonwealth Games medallists in lawn bowls
Year of birth missing
Medallists at the 1954 British Empire and Commonwealth Games